The Ukrainian Athletics Championships is an annual outdoor track and field competition organised by the Ukrainian Athletic Federation, which serves as the national championship for the sport in Ukraine. The competition was first held as a top level national competition in 1992, superseding the Soviet Athletics Championships following the dissolution of the Soviet Union.

Men

100 metres
1992: Konstantin Gromadskiy
1993: Aleksandr Shlychkov
1994: Vladyslav Dolohodin
1995: Aleksey Chikhachov
1996: Serhiy Osovych
1997: Vladyslav Dolohodin
1998: Anatoliy Dovhal
1999: Kostyantyn Rurak
2000: Kostyantyn Rurak
2001: Anatoliy Dovhal
2002: Kostyantyn Rurak
2003: Kostyantyn Rurak
2004: Anatoliy Dovhal
2005: Anatoliy Dovhal
2006: Anatoliy Dovhal

200 metres
1992: Igor Streltsov
1993: Aleksey Chikhachov
1994: Aleksey Chikhachov
1995: Vladyslav Dolohodin
1996: Roman Galkin
1997: Vladyslav Dolohodin
1998: Sergey Polinkov
1999: Serhiy Osovych
2000: Sergey Polinkov
2001: Anatoliy Dovhal
2002: Kostyantyn Rurak
2003: Yevhen Zyukov
2004: Dmitriy Glushchenko
2005: Dmitriy Glushchenko
2006: Dmitriy Glushchenko

400 metres
1992: Ivan Bednenko
1993: Vasiliy Lozinskiy
1994: Vadim Ogiy
1995: Valentin Kulbatskiy
1996: Valentin Kulbatskiy
1997: Roman Galkin
1998: Roman Galkin
1999: Roman Voronko
2000: Aleksandr Kaydash
2001: Yevhen Zyukov
2002: Andrey Tverdostup
2003: Andrey Tverdostup
2004: Andrey Tverdostup
2005: Andrey Tverdostup
2006: Yevhen Zyukov

800 metres
1992: Andrey Chernkolpakov
1993: Andrey Mitin
1994: Andrey Buzhenko
1995: Anatoliy Yakimovich
1996: Anatoliy Yakimovich
1997: Yevgeniy Karlash
1998: Andrey Shokur
1999: Andrey Bulkovskiy
2000: Anatoliy Yakimovich
2001: Vladimir Kovalik
2002: Ivan Heshko
2003: Ivan Heshko
2004: Andrey Tomylin
2005: Ivan Heshko
2006: Aleksandr Osmolovych

1500 metres
1992: Andrey Chernkolpakov
1993: Leonid Lyashenko
1994: Igor Lischinskiy
1995: Andrey Bulkovskiy
1996: Andrey Bulkovskiy
1997: Igor Lischinskiy
1998: Serhiy Lebid
1999: Anatoliy Yakimovich
2000: Ivan Heshko
2001: Ivan Heshko
2002: Ivan Heshko
2003: Ivan Heshko
2004: Ivan Heshko
2005: Serhiy Lebid
2006: Nikolay Labovskiy

5000 metres
1992: Valeriy Chesak
1993: Yevgeniy Sirotin
1994: Valeriy Chesak
1995: Serhiy Lebid
1996: Serhiy Lebid
1997: Igor Lischinskiy
1998: Maksim Yanishevskiy
1999: Serhiy Lebid
2000: Serhiy Lebid
2001: Serhiy Lebid
2002: Dmytro Baranovskyy
2003: Serhiy Lebid
2004: Serhiy Lebid
2005: Vasiliy Matviychuk
2006: Yevgeniy Bozhko

10,000 metres
1992: Leonid Nasedkin
1993: Viktor Karpenko
1994: Valeriy Chesak
1995: Valeriy Chesak
1996: Anatoliy Zeruk
1997: Andriy Naumov
1998: Sergey Rusetskiy
1999: Andrey Gladishev
2000: Yuriy Gychun
2001: Nikolay Rudik
2002: Mikhail Iveryuk
2003: Serhiy Lebid
2004: Vasiliy Matviychuk
2005: Vasiliy Matviychuk
2006: Mikhail Iveryuk

20K run
2006: Oleksandr Kuzin

Half marathon
1999: Igor Osmak
2000: ?
2001: ?
2002: ?
2003: Nikolay Rudik
2004: Vasiliy Matviychuk

Marathon
1994: Pavel Vasilenko
1995: ?
1996: ?
1997: ?
1998: ?
1999: ?
2000: ?
2001: ?
2002: ?
2003: Aleksandr Golovnitskiy
2004: Sergey Kryzhko

3000 metres steeplechase
1992: Aleksey Patserin
1993: Aleksey Patserin
1994: Aleksey Patserin
1995: Ivan Tvardovskiy
1996: Aleksey Patserin
1997: Sergey Redko
1998: Sergey Redko
1999: Sergey Redko
2000: Sergey Redko
2001: Sergey Redko
2002: Vadym Slobodenyuk
2003: Vadym Slobodenyuk
2004: Vadym Slobodenyuk
2005: Vadym Slobodenyuk
2006: Vadym Slobodenyuk

110 metres hurdles
1992: Vladimir Belokon
1993: Vladimir Belokon
1994: Vladimir Belokon
1995: Vladimir Belokon
1996: Vladimir Belokon
1997: Dmitriy Kolesnichenko
1998: Dmitriy Kolesnichenko
1999: Dmitriy Kolesnichenko
2000: Denis Kozhemyakin
2001: Sergey Smolenskiy
2002: Vladimir Ovcharov
2003: Serhiy Demydyuk
2004: Serhiy Demydyuk
2005: Serhiy Demydyuk
2006: Serhiy Demydyuk

400 metres hurdles
1992: Vyacheslav Orinchuk
1993: 
1994: Hennadiy Horbenko
1995: Hennadiy Horbenko
1996: Andrey Kleymenov
1997: 
1998: Roman Voronko
1999: Hennadiy Horbenko
2000: Hennadiy Horbenko
2001: Hennadiy Horbenko
2002: Hennadiy Horbenko
2003: Hennadiy Horbenko
2004: Hennadiy Horbenko
2005: Hennadiy Horbenko
2006: Denis Grishchuk

High jump
1992: Yuriy Sergiyenko
1993: Viacheslav Tyrtyshnik
1994: Yuriy Sergiyenko
1995: Sergey Kolesnik
1996: Viacheslav Tyrtyshnik
1997: 
1998: Viacheslav Tyrtyshnik
1999: Serhiy Dymchenko
2000: Andriy Sokolovskyy
2001: Andriy Sokolovskyy
2002: Ruslan Glivinskiy
2003: Andriy Sokolovskyy
2004: Andriy Sokolovskyy
2005: Yuriy Krymarenko
2006: Andriy Sokolovskyy

Pole vault
1992: Sergey Yesipchuk
1993: Aleksandr Chernyayev
1994: Vasiliy Bubka
1995: Vyacheslav Shuteyev
1996: Vasiliy Bubka
1997: Vyacheslav Shuteyev
1998: Vyacheslav Shuteyev
1999: Denys Yurchenko
2000: Denys Yurchenko
2001: Ruslan Yeremenko
2002: Denys Yurchenko
2003: Denys Yurchenko
2004: Ruslan Yeremenko
2005: Oleksandr Korchmid
2006: Denys Yurchenko

Long jump
1992: Sergey Layevskiy
1993: Vitaliy Kyrylenko
1994: Vitaliy Kyrylenko
1995: Vitaliy Kyrylenko
1996: Oleksy Lukashevych
1997: Vitaliy Kyrylenko
1998: Roman Shchurenko
1999: Roman Shchurenko
2000: Oleksy Lukashevych
2001: Volodymyr Zyuskov
2002: Volodymyr Zyuskov
2003: Volodymyr Zyuskov
2004: Volodymyr Zyuskov
2005: Volodymyr Zyuskov
2006: Oleksy Lukashevych

Triple jump
1992: Ilya Yashchuk
1993: Volodymyr Inozemtsev
1994: Vladimir Kravchenko
1995: Viktor Popko
1996: Sergey Izmailov
1997: Yuriy Osipenko
1998: Vitaliy Kolpakov
1999: Sergey Izmailov
2000: Sergey Izmailov
2001: Vladimir Kravchenko
2002: Mykola Savolaynen
2003: Mykola Savolaynen
2004: Viktor Yastrebov
2005: Viktor Yastrebov
2006: Mykola Savolaynen

Shot put
1992: Aleksandr Klimenko
1993: Andriy Nemchaninov
1994: Oleksandr Bagach
1995: Oleksandr Bagach
1996: Andriy Nemchaninov
1997: Oleksandr Bagach
1998: Oleksandr Bagach
1999: Oleksandr Bagach
2000: Roman Virastyuk
2001: Yuriy Bilonoh
2002: Roman Virastyuk
2003: Yuriy Bilonoh
2004: Roman Virastyuk
2005: Yuriy Bilonoh
2006: Yuriy Bilonoh

Discus throw
1992: Volodymyr Zinchenko
1993: Volodymyr Zinchenko
1994: Volodymyr Zinchenko
1995: Vitaliy Sidorov
1996: Vitaliy Sidorov
1997: Vitaliy Sidorov
1998: Vitaliy Sidorov
1999: Yuriy Bilonoh
2000: Kirill Chuprinin
2001: Yuriy Bilonoh
2002: 
2003: Yuriy Bilonoh
2004: Kirill Chuprinin
2005: Kirill Chuprinin
2006: Yuriy Bilonoh

Hammer throw
1992: Andriy Skvaruk
1993: Vadim Kolesnikov
1994: Andriy Skvaruk
1995: Andriy Skvaruk
1996: Andriy Skvaruk
1997: Vadim Kolesnikov
1998: Vladyslav Piskunov
1999: Vladyslav Piskunov
2000: Vladyslav Piskunov
2001: Andriy Skvaruk
2002: Oleksandr Krykun
2003: Andriy Skvaruk
2004: Artem Rubanko
2005: Andriy Skvaruk
2006: Ihor Tuhay

Javelin throw
1992: Andrey Maznichenko
1993: Andrey Novikov
1994: Andrey Maznichenko
1995: Andrey Uglov
1996: Andrey Uglov
1997: Andrey Maznichenko
1998: Sergey Volochay
1999: Yuriy Drozdov
2000: Oleg Statsenko
2001: Oleg Statsenko
2002: Oleg Statsenko
2003: Oleg Statsenko
2004: Oleg Statsenko
2005: Oleg Statsenko
2006: Roman Avramenko

Decathlon
1992: Vitaliy Kolpakov
1993: Vitaliy Kolpakov
1994: Sergey Blonskiy
1995: Sergey Blonskiy
1996: Viktor Dvlyakh
1997: Vladimir Mikhaylenko
1998: Vladimir Mikhaylenko
1999: Yuriy Zhuravskiy
2000: Fyodor Laukhin
2001: Sergey Blonskiy
2002: ?
2003: Fyodor Laukhin
2004: Oleksandr Yurkov
2005: Yuriy Blonskiy
2006: Nikolay Shulga

20 kilometres walk
The 1993 and 1998 championships races were held on a track.
1992: K. Gornev
1993: 
1994: Anatoliy Kozlov
1995: Pavel Andriyenko
1996: Nikolay Kalitka
1997: Andrey Kovenko
1998: Andrey Kovenko
1999: ?
2000: Aleksey Shelest
2001: Aleksey Shelest
2002: Andrey Yurin
2003: Aleksey Shelest
2004: Andrey Yurin
2005: Andrey Kovenko
2006: Andrey Yurin

30 kilometres walk
1997: Vitaliy Popovich

50 kilometres walk
1993: Vitaliy Popovich
1994: Vitaliy Popovich
1995: Vitaliy Popovich
1996: ?
1997: ?
1998: ?
1999: Aleksey Shelest
2000: ?
2001: ?
2002: Aleksey Shelest
2003: Aleksey Shelest
2004: Aleksey Shelest
2005: Aleksey Shelest

Women

100 metres
1992: Anzhelika Shevchuk
1993: Irina Slyusar
1994: Zhanna Pintusevich-Block
1995: Zhanna Pintusevich-Block
1996: Iryna Pukha
1997: Anzhela Kravchenko
1998: Anzhela Kravchenko
1999: Anzhela Kravchenko
2000: Anzhela Kravchenko
2001: Anzhela Kravchenko
2002: Anzhela Kravchenko
2003: Yelena Pastushenko
2004: Irina Kozhemyakina
2005: Irina Shtanhyeyeva
2006: Natalya Pogrebnyak

200 metres
1992: Yelena Nasonkina
1993: Irina Slyusar
1994: Viktoriya Fomenko
1995: Viktoriya Fomenko
1996: Viktoriya Fomenko
1997: Anzhela Kravchenko
1998: Tetyana Bonenko
1999: Tatyana Tkalich
2000: Yelena Pastushenko
2001: Tatyana Tkalich
2002: Anzhela Kravchenko
2003: Maryna Maydanova
2004: Maryna Maydanova
2005: Maryna Maydanova
2006: Elena Chebanu

400 metres
1992: Yelena Nasonkina
1993: Yelena Nasonkina
1994: Lyudmila Koshchev
1995: Yelena Rurak
1996: Olha Moroz
1997: Tatyana Movchan
1998: Yelena Rurak
1999: Irina Misiruk
2000: Yelena Rurak
2001: Olga Mishchenko
2002: Antonina Yefremova
2003: Antonina Yefremova
2004: Antonina Yefremova
2005: Antonina Yefremova
2006: Oksana Shcherbak

800 metres
1992: Yelena Storchovaya
1993: Yelena Zavadskaya
1994: Yelena Zavadskaya
1995: Inna Yevseyeva
1996: Lyudmila Koshchev
1997: Oksana Ilyushkina
1998: Yelena Buzhenko
1999: Iryna Lishchynska
2000: Yelena Buzhenko
2001: Galina Misiruk
2002: Yuliya Krevsun
2003: Tamara Volkova
2004: Tetiana Petlyuk
2005: Nelya Neporadna
2006: Nataliya Tobias

1500 metres
1992: Tatyana Pozdnyakova
1993: ?
1994: Yelena Storchovaya
1995: Svetlana Miroshnik
1996: Svetlana Miroshnik
1997: Tatyana Belovol
1998: Yelena Gorodnicheva
1999: Yelena Gorodnicheva
2000: Tatyana Krivobok
2001: Iryna Lishchynska
2002: Iryna Lishchynska
2003: Iryna Lishchynska
2004: Iryna Lishchynska
2005: Tatyana Krivobok
2006: Tetyana Holovchenko

3000 metres
1992: Svetlana Miroshnik
1993: Zoya Kaznovskaya
1994: Tatyana Belovol

5000 metres
1995: Tamara Koba
1996: Olena Zhupiyeva-Vyazova
1997: Tatyana Belovol
1998: Tatyana Belovol
1999: Svetlana Nekhorosh
2000: Nataliya Berkut
2001: Tatyana Belovol
2002: Marina Dubrova
2003: Nataliya Tobias
2004: Marina Dubrova
2005: Marina Dubrova
2006: Nataliya Berkut

10,000 metres
1992: Natalya Lagunkova
1993: Olena Zhupiyeva-Vyazova
1994: Nataliya Vorobyova
1995: Tatyana Pozdnyakova
1996: Olena Zhupiyeva-Vyazova
1997: Rimma Dubovik
1998: Rimma Dubovik
1999: Svetlana Nekhorosh
2000: Nataliya Berkut
2001: Nataliya Berkut
2002: Nataliya Berkut
2003: Nataliya Berkut
2004: Nataliya Berkut
2005: Nataliya Berkut
2006: Oksana Sklyarenko

20K run
2006: Olga Kalendaryova

Half marathon
1999: Yelena Plastinina
2000: ?
2001: ?
2002: ?
2003: Marina Dubrova
2004: Tatyana Gladyr

Marathon
2003: Tatyana Bulyshchenko
2004: Katerina Stetsenko

2000 metres steeplechase
1992: Svetlana Lyegkodukh
1993: ?
1994: Olga Kozel
1995: Olga Kozel
1996: Tatyana Babik
1997: Anzhelika Averkova
1998: Tatyana Gladyr

3000 metres steeplechase
2000: Anzhelika Averkova
2001: Anzhelika Averkova
2002: Anzhelika Averkova
2003: Valentina Gorpinich
2004: Valeriya Mara
2005: Valentina Gorpinich
2006: Yuliya Ignatova

100 metres hurdles
1992: Yelena Politika
1993: Nadiya Bodrova
1994: Nadiya Bodrova
1995: Olena Krasovska
1996: Nadiya Bodrova
1997: Maya Shemchishina
1998: Olena Krasovska
1999: Olena Krasovska
2000: Olena Krasovska
2001: Olena Krasovska
2002: Olena Krasovska
2003: Olena Krasovska
2004: Olena Krasovska
2005: Yevgeniya Snigur
2006: Yevgeniya Snigur

400 metres hurdles
1992: Lyudmila Khodasevich
1993: 
1994: Tetyana Tereshchuk-Antipova
1995: Lyudmila Khodasevich
1996: Tetyana Tereshchuk-Antipova
1997: Tatyana Debelaya
1998: Tatyana Debelaya
1999: Tetyana Tereshchuk-Antipova
2000: Tatyana Debelaya
2001: Tetyana Tereshchuk-Antipova
2002: Tatyana Debelaya
2003: Anastasiya Rabchenyuk
2004: Anastasiya Rabchenyuk
2005: Anastasiya Rabchenyuk
2006: Anastasiya Rabchenyuk

High jump
1992: Inha Babakova
1993: Larisa Serebryanskaya
1994: Iryna Mykhalchenko
1995: Vita Styopina
1996: Vita Styopina
1997: Iryna Mykhalchenko
1998: Iryna Mykhalchenko
1999: Vita Styopina
2000: Iryna Mykhalchenko
2001: Vita Palamar
2002: Iryna Mykhalchenko
2003: Vita Palamar
2004: Vita Styopina
2005: Iryna Mykhalchenko
2006: Iryna Mykhalchenko

Pole vault
1996: Anzhela Balakhonova
1997: Anzhela Balakhonova
1998: Lyudmila Prikhodko
1999: Anzhela Balakhonova
2000: Anzhela Balakhonova
2001: Anzhela Balakhonova
2002: Yevgeniya Katkova
2003: Natalya Kushch-Mazuryk
2004: Anzhela Balakhonova
2005: Anzhela Balakhonova
2006: Alevtina Ruyeva

Long jump
1992: Olena Khlopotnova
1993: Larysa Berezhna
1994: Yelena Semiraz
1995: Olena Khlopotnova
1996: Olena Shekhovtsova
1997: Olena Shekhovtsova
1998: Olena Khlopotnova
1999: Viktoriya Vershynina
2000: Olena Shekhovtsova
2001: Olena Shekhovtsova
2002: Olena Shekhovtsova
2003: Nataliya Sorokina
2004: Viktoriya Molchanova
2005: Viktoriya Molchanova
2006: Viktoriya Rybalko

Triple jump
1992: Tatyana Olkhovaya
1993: Olga Boyko
1994: Viktoriya Vershynina
1995: Inessa Kravets
1996: Olena Hovorova
1997: Olena Hovorova
1998: Olena Hovorova
1999: Olena Hovorova
2000: Olena Hovorova
2001: Olena Hovorova
2002: Olena Hovorova
2003: Olena Hovorova
2004: Olena Hovorova
2005: Aleksandra Shyshlyuk
2006: Tetyana Dyachenko

Shot put
1992: Lyudmila Voyevodskaya
1993: Vita Pavlysh
1994: Valentina Fedyushina
1995: Vita Pavlysh
1996: Vita Pavlysh
1997: Valentina Fedyushina
1998: Yelena Dementiy
1999: Yelena Dementiy
2000: Yelena Dementiy
2001: Vita Pavlysh
2002: Yelena Dementiy
2003: Vita Pavlysh
2004: Oksana Zakharchuk
2005: Tatyana Nasonova
2006: Oksana Zakharchuk

Discus throw
1992: Ilona Zakharchenko
1993: Olga Nikishina
1994: Olga Nikishina
1995: Olena Antonova
1996: Olena Antonova
1997: Olena Antonova
1998: Olena Antonova
1999: Olena Antonova
2000: Olena Antonova
2001: Olena Antonova
2002: Olena Antonova
2003: Olena Antonova
2004: Olena Antonova
2005: Olena Antonova
2006: Katerina Karsak

Hammer throw
1992: Natalya Vasilenko
1993: ?
1994: Marina Pirog
1995: Natalya Kunitskaya
1996: Marina Pirog
1997: Natalya Kunitskaya
1998: Irina Martynenko
1999: Natalya Kunitskaya
2000: Irina Sekachova
2001: Irina Sekachova
2002: Irina Sekachova
2003: Irina Sekachova
2004: Irina Sekachova
2005: Irina Sekachova
2006: Irina Sekachova

Javelin throw
1992: Irina Kostyuchenkova
1993: Irina Kostyuchenkova
1994: Irina Kostyuchenkova
1995: Olga Ivankova
1996: Olga Ivankova
1997: Olga Ivankova
1998: Nadezhda Kobrin
1999: Kristina Klyshevskaya
2000: Nadezhda Kobrin
2001: Tatyana Lyakhovich
2002: Kristina Klyshevskaya
2003: Zhanna Slastina
2004: Tatyana Lyakhovich
2005: Olga Ivankova
2006: Olga Ivankova

Heptathlon
1992: Marina Shcherbina
1993: Marina Shcherbina
1994: Irina Matyusheva
1995: Marina Shcherbina
1996: Yuliya Akulenko
1997: Marina Shcherbina
1998: Lyudmyla Kovalenko
1999: Elmira Sokhovtinova
2000: Lyudmyla Blonska
2001: Marina Bryukhach
2002: ?
2003: Zhanna Melnychenko
2004: Yuliya Akulenko
2005: Yuliya Akulenko
2006: Marina Bryuhach

10,000 metres walk
1993: Natalya Serbinenko
1994: ?
1995: Tatyana Ragozina
1996: ?
1997: Vira Zozulya
1998: Tatyana Ragozina

10 kilometres walk
1994: Tatyana Ragozina
1995: Olga Leonenko
1996: Valentina Savchuk
1997: Valentina Savchuk

20 kilometres walk
2000: Vira Zozulya
2001: Vira Zozulya
2002: Olga Lukyanchuk
2003: Vira Zozulya
2004: Vira Zozulya
2005: Vira Zozulya
2006: Nadiya Borovska

References

Champions 1992–2006
Ukrainian Championships. GBR Athletics. Retrieved 2021-02-05.

Winners
 List
Ukrainian Championships
Athletics